Ian Langford (2 June 1936 – 25 February 2017) was an Australian cricketer. He played one first-class cricket match for Victoria in 1962.

See also
 List of Victoria first-class cricketers

References

External links
 

1936 births
2017 deaths
Australian cricketers
Victoria cricketers
Cricketers from Melbourne